Laminusa is an island in the municipality of Siasi, Sulu, Philippines. It is one of the islands of the Sulu Archipelago, a chain of islands between the islands of Mindanao and Borneo.

Most of the residents are engaged in fishing. But, Laminusa is also famous for producing colorful intricate-designed mats made by women weavers.

Overview
Administratively, Laminusa Island is part of the municipality of Siasi. The island is subdivided into the following barangays:

 Kong-Kong Laminusa
 Luuk Laminusa
 Puukan Laminusa
 Tampakan Laminusa
 Tengah Laminusa
 Tong Laminusa

Geography
The island is part of the Sulu Archipelago. It is around 1 km. east from the island of Siasi and has an estimated total land area of 0.78 km2

Demographics
The total population of Laminusa is 12,830. With a relatively small area, the island is regarded as one of the densely populated islands in the Philippines.

Below is the population of the barangays that constitute the island of Laminusa

See also
 List of islands by population density

References

Islands of the Philippines